The following is a list of most expensive association football transfers in Romania, which details the highest transfer fees ever paid for players in the Liga I.

The current record is held by Dennis Man, after Parma completed his signing from FCSB in a deal worth €11 million plus add-ons, on 29 January 2021. The previous transfer record was held by Nicolae Stanciu since 2017, who was bought by Anderlecht for €9.8 million, also from FCSB.

Outgoing Liga I transfers

Notes

Gallery

References

Football records and statistics in Romania
Romania
Expensive